Fort Wilson is an unincorporated community located in Payette County, Idaho, United States.

References

Unincorporated communities in Payette County, Idaho
Unincorporated communities in Idaho